The Kyambogo Cricket Oval is a cricket ground in Kampala, Uganda. It hosted matches in the 2017 ICC World Cricket League Division Three tournament, and hosted matches in the Regional Finals of the 2018–19 ICC World Twenty20 Africa Qualifier tournament in May 2019.

International record

Twenty20 International five-wicket hauls
One T20I five-wicket haul has been taken at this venue.

References

Cricket grounds in Uganda
Sport in Uganda
Buildings and structures in Kampala